The Sri Lankan shrew (Suncus fellowesgordoni), also called Gordon's pygmy shrew, is a species of mammal in the family Soricidae. It is endemic to Sri Lanka. It is threatened by habitat loss. It is known as හික් මීයා in Sinhala. It was named after the wife of A. C. Tutein-Nolthenius, Marjory née Fellowes-Gordon, who collected specimens of the shrew and provided them to Phillips.

Description 
Females are larger than males. They are dark chocolate brown to blackish brown above and dark gray with a silver sheen below. The throat is very gray in color, while the snout, ears, and forefeet are pink and the claws reddish brown. The tail has gray hairs that are dark above and light below.

References

Suncus
Mammals of Sri Lanka
Taxonomy articles created by Polbot
Mammals described in 1932